The 2011 Barum Czech Rally Zlín was the seventh round of the 2011 Intercontinental Rally Challenge (IRC) season, and also a round of the European Rally Championship. The fifteen stage asphalt rally took place over 26–28 August 2011. Other than the opening stage on Friday night, all stages were run in daylight.

Introduction
The rally, which was run for the 41st time, was based in the Moravian town of Zlín. Friday saw the ceremonial start and opening super-special stage running through the streets of Zlín. On Saturday a further eight stages covering  were run on asphalt with the final six stages, consisting of  being completed on the Sunday.

Results
Jan Kopecký took his first win in the Intercontinental Rally Challenge for over a year, holding off Freddy Loix by just 1.2 seconds, the closest finish in series history.

Overall

Special stages

References

External links 
 The official website for the rally
 The official website of the Intercontinental Rally Challenge

Czech
Czech Rally
Barum Rally Zlín